The Loire 210 was a French single-seat catapult-launched fighter seaplane designed and built by Loire Aviation for the French Navy.

Design and development
The Loire 210 was designed to meet a 1933 French Navy requirement for a single-seat catapult-launched fighter seaplane. The prototype first flew at Saint Nazaire on 21 March 1935. The fuselage came from the earlier Loire 46 fitted with a new low-wing which was foldable for shipboard stowage. It had a large central float and two underwing auxiliary floats and was powered by a single nose-mounted Hispano-Suiza 9Vbs radial engine.

The prototype was evaluated by the French Navy against the Bernard H 110, Potez 453 and Romano R.90 with the 210 achieving a production order for 20 aircraft in March 1937. The production aircraft were fitted with four wing-mounted Darne machine guns (the prototype had only two).

Operational history
The aircraft entered service with the French Navy in August 1939, within three months five aircraft had been lost due to structural failure of the wing. All the remaining aircraft were grounded and withdrawn from use.

Variants
Loire 210.01
First prototype aircraft.
Loire 210
Single-seat fighter seaplane.
Loire 211
Prototype with a more powerful Gnome-Rhône 14K engine.

Operators

French Navy
Escadrille HC.1
Escadrille HC.2

Specifications

See also

References

Notes

Bibliography

 Green, William. War Planes of the Second World War: Volume Six Floatplanes. London: Macdonald, 1962.
 Green, William and F. Gordon Swanborough. The Complete Book of Fighters. London: Smithmark, 1994. .
 The Illustrated Encyclopedia of Aircraft (Part Work 1982–1985). London: Orbis Publishing, 1985. 
 Taylor, John W. R., and Jean Alexander. Combat Aircraft of the World. New York: G.P. Putnam's Sons, 1969. 
 Taylor, Michael J. H. Jane's Encyclopedia of Aviation. London: Studio Editions, 1989.

External links

 Loire 210 - Hydravion de chasse - Un siècle d'aviation française Aviafrance.

210
World War II French fighter aircraft
1930s French fighter aircraft
Floatplanes
Single-engined tractor aircraft
Low-wing aircraft